The first campaign of the Dungeons & Dragons web series Critical Role premiered on March 12, 2015; it consisted of 115 episodes and concluded on October 12, 2017. It followed Vox Machina, a party of seven to eight adventurers, in their travels across the continent of Tal'Dorei. Campaign one broadcast live each Thursday at 19:00 PT on Geek & Sundry's Twitch channel, with the video on demand (VOD) being available to Twitch subscribers immediately after the broadcast. On the Monday following the live stream, the VODs were made available for the public on the Geek & Sundry YouTube channel.

Cast

Main 
For the first 27 episodes Campaign 1 had nine cast members: eight players and a Dungeon Master. This became eight from episode 28 to the conclusion of the campaign with episode 115.
 Matthew Mercer as the Dungeon Master
 Ashley Johnson as Pike Trickfoot, gnome cleric
 Travis Willingham as Grog Strongjaw, goliath barbarian / fighter
 Laura Bailey as Vex'ahlia "Vex" de Rolo, née Vessar, half-elf ranger / rogue
 Liam O'Brien as Vax'ildan "Vax" Vessar, half-elf rogue/paladin/druid
 Taliesin Jaffe as Percival "Percy" Fredrickstein Von Musel Klossowski de Rolo III, human gunslinger
 Marisha Ray as Keyleth of the Air Ashari, half-elf druid
 Orion Acaba as Tiberius Stormwind, dragonborn sorcerer; the sorcerer leaves Vox Machina during the journey to Whitestone and is later killed when the Chroma Conclave attacks Draconia.
 Sam Riegel as: 
 Scanlan Shorthalt, gnome bard ; the bard temporarily leaves the group to spend time with his daughter and to focus on self-discovery.
 Taryon Darrington, human artificer; the artificer joins Vox Machina after the defeat of the Chroma Conclave.

Guest 
In total, 13 guest players appeared in Campaign 1. 
 Felicia Day as Lyra, human wizard
 Mary Elizabeth McGlynn as Zahra Hydris, tiefling warlock
 Wil Wheaton as Thorbir Falbek, dwarf fighter
 Will Friedle as Kashaw Vesh, human cleric
 Kit Buss as Lillith Anioska Daturai, tiefling wizard
 Jason C. Miller as Garthok, half-orc rogue
 Chris Hardwick as Gern Blanston, dragonborn wizard
 Chris Perkins as Shale, goliath fighter
 Patrick Rothfuss as Kerrek, human paladin
 ND Stevenson as Tova, dwarf/werebear blood hunter
 Jon Heder as Lionel "Chod" Gayheart, half-orc bard/barbarian
 Darin De Paul as Ethrid "Sprigg" Brokenbranch, gnome rogue
 Joe Manganiello as Arkhan the Cruel, red dragonborn paladin/barbarian

Synopsis 
The Kraghammer story arc (16 episodes, 1–16) starts in media res at the point in Vox Machina's story where the cast's original home game left off. It takes place primarily in the subterranean depths of the Underdark, and culminates in a battle between Vox Machina and a dangerous beholder by the name of K'varn, who is controlling an entire city of Illithid.

The Vasselheim story arc (7 episodes, 17–23) splits the party into two groups, who seek to prove their worth to the "Slayer's Take", a local adventurer's guild in the ancient city of Vasselheim, by taking on dangerous missions. This arc features multi-episode guest appearances by Felicia Day (Lyra), Mary Elizabeth McGlynn (Zahra), Wil Wheaton (Thorbir), and Will Friedle (Kashaw), adding a new twist to the now-divided adventuring band. This arc also includes the first episode (episode 22) that touches on a character's backstory, as Keyleth visits another druid tribe to continue her Aramenté, a journey to become the leader of her people.

The Briarwood story arc (15 episodes, 24–38) leads Vox Machina to Percy's ancestral home, the city of Whitestone, which was once ruled by his family. The party have to fight for control over Whitestone against Lord and Lady Briarwood, who are responsible for the demise of most of the de Rolo family and have taken the city as their own. The Briarwood's ties into necromancy and a secret cult make things even more dangerous, and Vox Machina must stop them from completing a ritual that threatens to endanger the entire kingdom. During the early stages of this arc, Tiberius leaves Vox Machina for good.

The Chroma Conclave story arc (46 episodes, 39–84) begins with the attack of four ancient chromatic dragons on Emon, the capital of Tal'Dorei, with the Sovereign and other important political figures falling in the onslaught. The dragons take control over and divide the kingdom, and in order to defeat them, Vox Machina needs more power than they currently have. They search for the "Vestiges of Divergence", famed and extremely powerful magical items from ages passed, which are scattered throughout the world. During the ongoing battles against the powerful dragons of the Chroma Conclave, the backstories of some characters are also further explored. Smaller arcs focus on Grog's herd that once exiled him, the last figure from Percy's traumatic past, as well as a strained family reunion for the twins, Vex and Vax.  Episodes in this arc are broken up into 3 parts (39-56, 57–69, 70–84) based on Geek & Sundry's change of colour in thumbnails on YouTube.

The Taryon Darrington story arc (15 episodes, 85–99) begins with the departure of Scanlan from the group, whose use of "spice" (an in-campaign illicit drug) and disagreements with the group culminate in an argument that shakes the party. While traveling to Ank'Harel on the continent of Marquet, Vox Machina meet Taryon Darrington, an inexperienced aspiring author and adventurer. Adventuring together with Taryon, some smaller story arcs see Vox Machina helping Keyleth (who seeks to complete her Aramenté), traveling to hell, as well as dealing with Taryon's family, who reside in the Dwendalian Empire on the continent of Wildemount. It also features Taryon's coming out story. During this arc, which is loosely defined by Scanlan's absence and Taryon's presence in the party, Pike's family also makes an appearance and her relationship with them is explored. The arc includes a one-year time skip between episodes 94 and 95.

The Cult of Vecna story arc (16 episodes, 100–115) revisits the mysterious and dangerous artifact that was activated beneath Whitestone Castle during the Briarwood story arc. Scanlan finally rejoins Vox Machina, while the party now has to fight a cult which tries to summon the evil lich demigod Vecna, who seeks to ascend to true godhood and rule Exandria. His ascension actually succeeds and he becomes the only god on this side of the Divine Gate, which keeps the other gods from directly interfering in the world they created. With the indirect help of some of the prime deities who aid them with special powers, Vox Machina are the only group of heroes who can possibly stop the "Whispered One" in one gigantic final battle.

After the conclusion of the primary campaign, several one-shots have taken place using Vox Machina. These include "The Search for Grog" and "The Search for Bob", which portray an adventure on the plane of Pandemonium which was only briefly summarized toward the end of the final episode. Additionally, the "Dalen's Closet" one-shot portrayed the wedding vow renewal of Vex'ahlia and Percy one year later.

Production and format 
The Vox Machina campaign originated as the home-game of the cast, which started in 2012. While the adventures prior to the Kraghammer arc in 2015 were not formally recorded, some shorter recordings have been released by the cast. The format and production values evolved significantly over the course of the run. While the show began at a simple table in the Geek & Sundry office, set backdrops were added, along with individual microphones for the cast.

Campaign one was originally broadcast live on the Geek & Sundry Twitch and YouTube channels between March 12, 2015, and October 12, 2017, for a total of 115 episodes. Starting in November 2016, it was also broadcast live on the Alpha streaming service from Legendary Digital Networks. The show on Alpha had a unique overlay that included "real-time character sheets, damage and heal animations, and visualizations". Campaign one's closed captions were transcribed by a fan group who submitted them to Geek & Sundry. Geek & Sundry then added these to the YouTube VODs. The VODs have since been uploaded to Critical Role's own YouTube channel. A number of cast members were absent during episode 12, and so Mercer ran a Dungeon Master workshop rather than a session with Vox Machina. Further workshop and DM tip videos would be released by Geek & Sundry over the following years but unlike episode 12 these were not given numerical episode designations.

Pre-game segments
An announcement segment was present through much of the run, usually with Mercer opening the show, followed by other announcements such as new merchandise or other projects from the cast. These would continue into the second campaign in a similar fashion. On occasion, guests would be present for the announcement segment, such as prop maker Kai Norman in episode 15. The opening and break sequences initially featured backstory videos about each player character- these were removed from the introduction in favour of a live-action opening sequence with the cast. A segment informally referred to as "Critmas" featured cast members opening mail and gifts from fans. This originated as a pre-game segment in episode 5, later becoming a sporadic post-game segment through the first half of the show's run. From December 2015, Geek & Sundry instead encouraged generous fans to donate to a list of sponsored charities.

Post-game segments
Several post-game segments were employed, particularly early on in the run. These included giveaways, Q&A sessions with the chat, and reading the names and messages of donors. Episode 11 featured a 45-minute dancing sequence after the game to celebrate reaching a subscription threshold. These segments later fell out of use and were edited out of the podcast versions of the episodes.

Episodes

2015

2016

2017

Specials

Reception 
In 2016, the show was nominated in the Streamy Awards for the "Gaming" category. By January 2021, the first episode of Campaign One had been watched 15 million times on YouTube.

The show's length has been emphasized by multiple critics. In 2016, Ben Kuchera, for Polygon, wrote: "According to Geek and Sundry the show has reached over 37 million minutes watched, with over one million minutes watched per episode on Twitch. The show’s YouTube account has over 1.3 million subscribers, with over 10,000 paying subscribers on Twitch. What’s even more surprising is that following the story requires a substantial commitment on the part of the viewer. Episodes of Critical Role often last multiple hours, or may even be split into multiple parts. [...] The first episode now has over 650,000 views on YouTube, and continues to be viewed as people become fans of the show and catch up on past episodes". In 2017, Chris DeVille, for The Verge, stated Critical Role is "arguably the most popular and influential D&D liveplay series" and that "the YouTube archive of Critical Role’s first episode has accumulated more than 5 million views — this for a three-hour video almost entirely consisting of pals sitting around a table and acting out whimsical characters. Two years and 114 mammoth episodes later, their imagined adventures have spun off a comic book, an art book, and even a line of merchandise [...] — all in addition to inspiring countless works of fan-generated art, music, and literature".

In 2017, Jevon Phillips, for the Los Angeles Times, wrote that Critical Role "is bare bones. Mercer guides the narrative action as dungeon master, and a group of players [...] sit at a table and play out scenarios — sometimes for more than four hours". Phillips also wrote that "combining the two — watching people onscreen (online or TV) who are playing role-playing games — would seem to go a step too far in terms of our need to be entertained. [...] The fact that these shows can average hundreds of thousands of views is probably lost on those who don’t regularly watch TV online (re: older viewers)". Ryan Teitman, for Slate, wrote "sure, it’s corny, but the actors sell their performances so well that you really begin to invest in their emotional arcs". Teitman highlighted the emotional impact of a devastating city-wide attack: "in the midst of the chaos, they search the streets, desperately looking for beloved friends and allies. And in those moments, I forgot that I was watching D&D—I only saw the anguish on the faces of each of the actors as everything their characters had come to love came crashing down around them. I wondered how they could possibly deal with so much death and destruction".

In 2020, Alexandria Turney, for Screen Rant, highlighted that starting Critical Role can be a "little daunting" and that campaign one's "quality is noticeably lacking compared to future episodes which can be off-putting for those not already invested", while campaign two is "highly recommended for new Critters to watch, as it makes it easier to fall in love with the cast, which then makes it easier to go back and watch some of the lower-quality sessions of the first campaign".

Emily Duncan, for Tor.com, on whether to start with the first or second campaign, suggests that new viewers "start at the beginning with Vox Machina simply because you know how many episodes you’re committing to ahead of time. The audio quality on the first twenty or so episodes is a little rough, and there’s some expected awkwardness as the group takes something that had been personal and private into the public eye". Duncan highlighted, "A popular consensus, and one I recommend, is starting at episode 24, which is the beginning of the Briarwood arc when the group ends up in a revenge quest for Percy, taking on a vampire power couple who murdered his family. Starting here skips over the first two arcs, The Mines of Kraghammer and the Adventures in Vasselheim (also called the Trial of the Take), but everyone at the table is more comfortable and the energy of the group is more vibrant after the removal of a player who caused some tension within the first two arcs. Because the campaign already drops you randomly at the beginning of a quest point, it’s easy to just start a little later on and pick up quickly enough on what has happened previously".

Adaptations 

 The campaign sourcebook, Critical Role: Tal'Dorei Campaign Setting (2017), is a guide to the setting of campaign one. It was published by Critical Role and Green Ronin Publishing under the Wizards of the Coast Open Game License and is not considered "official" Dungeons & Dragons material. The book is now out of print — a revised edition, titled Tal'Dorei Campaign Setting Reborn (2022), was released by Darrington Press. The revised edition reflects the twenty year progression of time between campaign one and campaign two.
The comic series, Critical Role: Vox Machina Origins, is an adaptation of the group's game before the show.
 The animated show adaptation, The Legend of Vox Machina, also includes a canon story that takes place within the pre-stream time frame. After the show was picked up by Amazon and "Amazon Prime Video ordered an additional 14 episodes, for a total of 24 episodes across two seasons", Critical Role announced that the animated show would adapt the full Briarwood arc along with other storylines from the game.
The cooperative legacy-lite campaign game, Critical Role Adventures, is scheduled to be released by Darrington Press. Ivan Van Norman, head of Darrington Press, said that "the focus will be on exploring new stories, instead of just 'playing through Campaign I.' "

Notes

References 

2010s YouTube series
2020s YouTube series
1
Works adapted into television shows
YouTube channels launched in 2018